Aachen Hauptbahnhof (German for Aachen main station) is the most important railway station for the city of Aachen, in the far west of Germany near the Dutch and Belgian border. It is the largest of the four currently active Aachen stations, and is integrated into the long-distance network.

History 
A station at Aachen was first opened in 1841, when the Rheinische Eisenbahngesellschaft opened its line from Cologne. The line first was extended to Herbesthal (near the Belgian border) and on 15 October 1843 to Antwerp. The first station was built outside of the city walls, however the city soon grew and the station eventually became surrounded by new buildings. The Prussian state railways deemed that rather impractical and decided to build a new station situated on a hillside. Embankments and new bridges were built from 1901 onward, and on 21 December 1905 the station opened at its new location.

The station remained largely undisturbed until suffering from damage in 1944, when German troops were retreating. However, since the rail link was highly valued by the Allied forces, damage was cleared up rather quickly and in 1950 all war damage had been removed from the site. Since 2002 the Cologne–Aachen high-speed railway line allows connections to Cologne with speeds up to 250 km/h (160 mph).

Electrification
In 1966, Aachen Hauptbahnhof was electrified. Due to its proximity to Belgium, it was decided to implement the switching point from the Deutsche Bahn's 15 kV AC to the 3000 V DC used by the NMBS/SNCB in the station. Tracks 6 to 9 therefore have a switchable catenary and are used for international Thalys, ICE and Regional-Express services.

Renovations 
The station hall was renovated from 2000 to 2006. In 2007 a new electronic signal box was built, enabling more streamlined operations and automatic switching of the correct voltages. The cost estimate for the revamp was around €40 million. The main changes were:
Construction of 400m long platforms for international traffic, replacing the old 250m platforms that did not allow economic usage due to their limited length.
Special through tracks (tracks 3 and 4) for freight trains to the Netherlands and Belgium (via Montzen) to Aachen West.
Constructional changes to the system changeover point to Belgium; a new track layout, which allows the smooth changeover of electric locomotives and is capable of handling the increasing number of through carriages.
Improvement of the layout to remove operating problems, especially in the sidings.

Train services

The following services currently call at Aachen Hbf:

Operational usage
Aachen Hauptbahnhof is served by the following lines:
 Cologne–Aachen (KBS 480)
 Aachen–Brussels
 Aachen–Mönchengladbach (KBS 485)
 Liège–Aachen line (KBS 480a/L 37)

References

External links

Railway stations in North Rhine-Westphalia
Hauptbahnhof
Art Nouveau architecture in Germany
Railway stations in Germany opened in 1905
Art Nouveau railway stations